Calvary Baptist Academy (CBA) is a private Preschool through 12th grade school located in New Braunfels, Texas in the United States. CBA is part of the educational ministry of Calvary Baptist Church. The school was founded in 1981. It uses online video to instruct students, with students averaging three to four hours a day watching instructional video provided by offsite teachers.

References

External links
 

Educational institutions established in 1981
Schools in Guadalupe County, Texas
Christian schools in Texas
Private K-12 schools in Texas
New Braunfels, Texas
1981 establishments in Texas